= Jhanga Bangial =

- Town
- Location within Pakistan
- Coordinates: 33.17°N 73.23°E
- Country: Pakistan
- Province: (Islamabad Capital Territory) Islamabad C.T
- Elevation: 458 m (1,503 ft)

Population
  - Total: 117,535
- Time zone: UTC+5 (PST)

Jhanga Bangial is a town in the Islamabad Capital Territory of Pakistan. It is located at 33° 17' 35N 73° 23' 45E with an altitude of 458 metres (1505 feet).

The village is named after the Rana Jahanzeib tribe, who make up the majority of the population.
